William Collins may refer to:

Arts
 William Collins (poet) (1721–1759), English poet
 William Collins (painter) (1788–1847), English landscape artist
 William Lucas Collins (1815–1887), English author and clergyman of the Church of England
 William Wiehe Collins (1862–1951), English architectural and landscape genre painter
 Billy Collins (born 1941), American poet
 William P. Collins, author of works on the Bábí and Bahá’í Faiths, see Bahá'í Faith in Europe

Politics
 William Collins (Roundhead), English politician who sat in the House of Commons from 1654 to 1659
 William Collins (Warwick MP) (died 1859), Member of Parliament (MP) for Warwick 1837–52
 William Collins (South African politician) (1803–1876), member Volksraad of the Orange Free State
 William Collins (New York politician) (1818–1878), U.S. congressman from New York
 William Whitehouse Collins (1853–1923), New Zealand Member of Parliament for Christchurch in the South Island
 William Collins (English surgeon) (1859–1946), British surgeon and Liberal Party politician
 William Collins (New Zealand surgeon) (1853–1934) sportsman, surgeon, and member of the New Zealand Legislative Council
 William A. Collins (born 1935), American politician, state representative and mayor from Norwalk, Connecticut
 William T. Collins, American politician, former acting mayor of New York City

Publishing
 William Collins (publisher) (1789–1853), Scottish founder of the William Collins, Sons publishing house
 William Collins (Lord Provost) (1817–1895), Scottish temperance movement activist; son of publisher William Collins.
 William Collins, Sons (est. 1819), Scottish publishing house, became part of HarperCollins in 1990, a subsidiary of News Corp.
 William Collins (imprint), a non-fiction publishing brand launched by HarperCollins in 2014

Sports
 William Collins (cricketer, born 1837) (1837–1876), Australian cricketer
 William Collins (cricketer, born 1848) (1848–1932), Welsh author and cricketer
 William Collins (cricketer, born 1868) (1868–1942), English cricketer
 William Collins (tennis), British tennis player from the 1920s and 30s, see 1930 Wimbledon Championships – Men's Singles
 William Collins (canoeist) (born 1932), Canadian canoer who competed in the 1956 Summer Olympics
 Bill Collins (athlete) (born 1950), American sprinter
 Billy Collins Jr. (1961–1984), American professional boxer

Others
 William Collins (colonist) (1756–1819), English naval officer and early settler in Tasmania, Australia
 William O. Collins (1809–1880), commandant of Fort Laramie, Wyoming; namesake of Fort Collins, Colorado and Camp Collins
 William Collins (bishop) (1867–1911), Bishop of Gibraltar in the Church of England
 William Henry Collins (1878–1937), Canadian geologist
 William Floyd Collins (1887–1925), American cave explorer
 William J. Collins (1896–1970), president of St. Ambrose University
 William R. Collins (1913–1991), United States Marine Corps general
 William Erle Collins (1929–2013), American parasitologist
 Bootsy Collins (William Earl Collins, born 1951), American funk bassist, singer and songwriter
 Mr William Collins, a fictional character in the Jane Austen novel Pride and Prejudice

See also
 Bill Collins (disambiguation)

Collins, William